Yolki (meaning New Year Trees), also known as Six Degrees of Celebration, is a 2010 Russian comedy film directed by Timur Bekmambetov. As of 2021, eight films have been made in the series. It is the most successful non-animated film franchise in Russia.

The films in the series represent a Russian tradition of the New Year's Movie where films that take place during the holiday season tap into the vein of hope, optimism, and possibility associated with New Year's in the Russian culture. Other examples include The Irony of Fate and The Irony of Fate 2 (also directed by Bekmambetov). Typically such films are released in December, just before the start of the holidays in Russia.

Plot
The film takes place in 11 different cities in Russia and tells the story of a series of different characters whose acquaintance is purely coincidental. The characters find themselves on New Year's Eve in difficult situations which they can only escape if they find help, by miracle or through six degrees of separation. According to this theory all the people on Earth are connected through six handshakes.

The film begins in Kaliningrad, the last city in Russia to celebrate the New Year. The story revolves around a local orphanage during the holiday. One orphan girl Varya, makes other children believe that her father is the Russian president. They promise to stop harassing her if her father blesses her with an encrypted message during the traditional televised New Year's Address. She does not know what to do, and her friend Vova tries to help and tells her about the Six Degrees of Separation theory. The characters in the film are a student, a thief and his connections with the policeman who caught him, a taxi driver in love with a famous pop singer, a businessman rushing to his beloved, two snowboarders. And so with the Caucasian snow cleaner at the Red Square, Varia's request is passed on to the Russian president who notices the encrypted message written on the snow in the Kremlin courtyard. On the New Year's Eve, the phrase "Santa Claus helps the one who helps himself" appears in the president's speech (Dmitri Medvedev makes a cameo appearance), thus verifying the theory of six degrees of separation.

Cast 
 Alina Bulynko as Varvara
 Sergey Pokhodaev as Vova
 Ivan Urgant as Boris Vorobyov
 Sergey Svetlakov as Evgeniy Pavlovich
 Elena Plaksina as Olya
 Vera Brezhneva as herself
 Nikita Presnyakov as Pasha Bondarev, cab driver
 Boris Khvoshnyansky as Fyodor
 Artur Smolyaninov as Aleksey
 Sergey Garmash as Valery Sinitsyn, police captain
 Ekaterina Vilkova as Alina
 Baimurat Allaberiyev as Yusuf
 Dmitry Medvedev as the President of Russia (himself)

Sequels 
The film has had the sequels Yolki 2 in 2011 and Yolki 3 in 2013 with most of the cast reprising their roles, as well as a prequel called Yolki 1914 in 2014.

A spin-off was released in 2015, titled Paws, Bones & Rock'n'roll. It was centered around the dogs which appeared in Yolki 3.

In 2016 Yolki 5 was released and in 2017 Yolki 6.

In 2018 Yolki 7 was released.

In 2021 the film Yolki 8 was released.

In May 2022 it was announced that the film Yolki 9''' has started shooting.

As of 2018, Yolki 3'' is the most profitable film of the series.

External links

References

Films directed by Dmitriy Kiselev
2010 films
2010 comedy films
Films directed by Timur Bekmambetov
Russian comedy films
Films set around New Year
Russian anthology films
Cultural depictions of Dmitry Medvedev
Bazelevs Company films
2010s Russian-language films
Films directed by Aleksandr Voytinskiy